Thunder Bay Generating Station is a defunct biomass-fired thermal power station owned by Ontario Power Generation ("OPG"). It is located on Mission Island in Thunder Bay, on the shore of Lake Superior.

Thunder Bay GS was in operation from 1963 to 2018. It was the last coal fired station in Ontario. The plant was initially shut down in April 2014 as part of Ontario's phase out of coal-fired electricity generation, before being converted to run on advanced biomass (wood pellets) and recommissioned on February 9, 2015.

Historic operations
Thunder Bay GS began operation in 1963, with one 100 MW coal-fuelled generating unit. Two additional coal-fuelled units were added in the early 1980s, and in 1984 the original 100 MW unit was removed from service. This plant is connected to the power grid via 115 kV and 230 kV transmission lines. The station occupies  on Mission Island, at the mouth of the Kaministiquia River delta on Thunder Bay. The stack was demolished on September 9, 2021.

The two coal-fuelled boilers provided a peak output of 326 MW fuelled by low-sulphur lignite coal from the Ravenscrag Formation in Southern Saskatchewan and low-sulphur sub-bituminous coal from the Powder River Basin in the United States.

While operating as a coal plant, annual production was approximately 1.5 billion kilowatt-hours (kWh), enough energy to supply over 100,000 households for one year.

Conversion from coal
There were multiple announcements on the future of Thunder Bay GS over a 10-year period.  The Ontario government initially proposed a conversion to natural gas in 2004 but subsequently cancelled that plan in 2006.

Then, as part of the 2010 Long-Term Energy Plan, Ontario's Ministry of Energy announced that Thunder Bay GS would be converted from coal to natural gas by the end of 2014.  This was part of the Ontario government's commitment to phase out all of its coal-burning power generation.

On 1 November 2012, OPG announced that the Ontario Power Authority requested that the conversion to natural gas be suspended until the Ontario Power Authority could assess generating needs in northwestern Ontario.  The next announcement on the generating station's fate was made in November 2013 when the Ministry of Energy announced that Thunder Bay GS would be converted to advanced biomass.

Ontario’s Minister of Energy Bob Chiarelli outlined the broad terms of the conversion in a directive to the Ontario Power Authority dated 16 December 2013.  Chiarelli noted that the station will have only one unit operating as a peaking plant and that OPG is only permitted to purchase 15,000 tonnes of fuel annually.  It was estimated that the 15,000 tonnes of fuel will permit the single unit to operate at 2% of capacity.
The generating station will have a five-year contract to produce electricity starting in January 2015.

, the plant burns steam treated wood pellets (biocoal) from Arbaflame in Norway.

On July 27, 2018 OPG and IESO announced the closure of Thunder Bay Generating Station due to having a leak in the boiler causing the station to be shut down since May.  Estimated repair costs would be about $5 million and the contract expiration in 2020 was not intended to be renewed.

In 2021 demolition began on the generation station by Hamilton-based company, Budget Demolition. The work is expected to take two to three years and the majority of the materials will be recycled.   The 650-foot chimney came down in a controlled demolition on 9 September 2021 and was captured on video on YouTube.

Emissions

The Thunder Bay Generating Station ranked within the top 200 facility emitters, according to Environment Canada.

*Calculated figures for CO2e are rounded to the nearest tonne.

See also

 Atikokan Generating Station
 Kakabeka Generating Station
 List of power stations in Canada

References
 Thunder Bay Generating Station Information Brochure

External links

 Ontario Power Generation: Thunder Bay Generating Station
 Archived version of "Ontario Power Generation: Thunder Bay Generating Station" (saved 30 March 2019)

Ontario Power Generation
Buildings and structures in Thunder Bay
Energy infrastructure completed in 1963
Energy infrastructure completed in 2015
Ontario electricity policy
Former coal-fired power stations in Canada
1963 establishments in Ontario
Biomass power stations in Ontario
2018 disestablishments in Ontario
Demolished buildings and structures in Ontario
Buildings and structures demolished in 2021